The Knowledge University (زانکۆی نۆلج in Kurdish) (جامعة نولج in Arabic), is a  private university located in Erbil, Iraqi Kurdistan, and licensed from the ministry of higher education and scientific research in Kurdistan Region of Iraq. Currently the university consists of 6 colleges.

Colleges
Pharmacy
Engineering
Science
Law
Education
Administrative and Financial Sciences

Centers
English Language Center 
Research Center
Continuing Education Center

References

External links
 

 Education in Kurdistan Region (Iraq)